"Stay Awake" is a song by Australian singer and songwriter Dean Lewis. The song was released in March 2019 as the third single from Lewis' debut studio album, A Place We Knew. Upon release Lewis said "it's about trying to hold onto someone who is thinking of leaving... It sounds happy, but if you listen to the lyrics you'll realise it's not.

After being added to Australian mainstream radio stations on 29 March, it was the most added song the following charting week.

Music video
The music video for "Stay Awake" was released on 17 April 2019.

Track listing

Charts

Weekly charts

Year-end charts

Certifications

Release history

References

2019 singles
Dean Lewis songs
Songs written by Neil Ormandy
Universal Music Australia singles
2019 songs
Songs written by Dean Lewis